The 1890–91 Football League was the third Football league season. After dominating and being crowned champions for the first two football league seasons Preston North End slipped to second and Everton won the league with a two-point gap. Meanwhile, there had been changes in the league since the last football league season, Stoke had not been re-elected to the football league, so joined the rival Football Alliance. They were replaced with Sunderland, who were nicknamed "the team of all talents" at the time.

Final league table
The table below is reproduced here in the exact form that it can be found at the Rec.Sport.Soccer Statistics Foundation website and in Rothmans Book of Football League Records 1888–89 to 1978–79, with home and away statistics separated.

Beginning with the season 1894–95, clubs finishing level on points were separated according to goal average (goals scored divided by goals conceded). In case one or more teams had the same goal difference, this system favoured those teams who had scored fewer goals. The goal average system was eventually scrapped beginning with the 1976–77 season. Since the goal average was used for this purpose for such a long time, it is presented in the tables below even for the seasons prior to 1894–95.

During the first five seasons of the league, that is until the season 1893–94 re-election process concerned the clubs which finished in the bottom four of the league.

Results

Team locations

The re-election process
The number of clubs in the Football League was to be increased by two for the 1891–92 season. In addition to the four League sides seeking re-election, six non-league clubs (five of them from the Football Alliance) also sought League membership. The voting went as follows:

References

See also

1890–91 in English football
1890 in association football
1891 in association football

1890-91
1